Kuzaran District is a district (bakhsh) in Kermanshah County, Kermanshah Province, Iran. At the 2006 census, its population was 15,162, in 3,282 families.  The District has one city: Kuzaran. The District has two rural districts (dehestan): Haft Ashiyan Rural District and Sanjabi Rural District.

References 

Kermanshah County
Districts of Kermanshah Province